Descensus (Latin, "descent") may refer to:

Descensus controversy, Arminianism in the Church of England
Descensus Christi, Harrowing of Hell
Descensus (album), a 2014 album by Circa Survive